Crac'h (official French name: Crach) or Krac'h in Breton is a commune in the Morbihan department of Brittany in north-western France.

Demographics
Inhabitants of Crac'h are called in French Crachois and in Breton Krac'hiz.

See also
Communes of the Morbihan department

References

External links

Official site 

Mayors of Morbihan Association 

Communes of Morbihan